Turlock is a city in Stanislaus County, California, United States. Its estimated 2019 population of 73,631 made it the second-largest city in Stanislaus County after Modesto.

History
Founded on December 22, 1871, by prominent grain farmer John William Mitchell, the town consisted of a post office, a depot, a grain warehouse and a few other buildings. Mitchell declined the honor of having the town named for himself. The name "Turlock" was then chosen instead. The name is believed to originate from the Irish village Turlough. In October 1870, Harper's Weekly published an excerpt from English novelist James Payn's story Bred in the Bone, which includes the mention of a town named "Turlough" (translated from Irish as "Turlock"). Local historians believe that the issue of Harper's Weekly was read by early resident H.W. Lander, who suggested the alternate name.

Mitchell and his brother were successful businessmen, buying land and developing large herds of cattle and sheep that were sold to gold miners and others as they arrived. They were also leaders in wheat farming and cultivated tracts of land under the tenant system. Eventually, the Mitchells owned most of the area, over 100,000 acres, from Keyes to Atwater. In the early 20th century, 20-acre lots from the Mitchell estate were sold for $20 an acre.

While it grew to be a relatively prosperous and busy hub of activity throughout the end of the 19th century, it was not incorporated as a city until February 15, 1908. By that time intensive agricultural development surrounded most of the city (agriculture remains the major economic force in the region in current times). Many of the initial migrants to the region were Swedish. As an early San Francisco Chronicle article stated of the region and the community's lacteal productivity, "you have to hand it to the Scandinavians for knowing how to run a dairy farm."

Turlock went on to become known as the "Heart of the Valley" because of its agricultural production. With the boom came racial and labor strife. In July 1921, a mob of 150 white men evicted 60 Japanese cantaloupe pickers from rooming houses and ranches near Turlock, taking them and their belongings on trucks out of town. The white men claimed the Japanese were undercutting white workers by taking lower wages per crate of fruit picked. In protest, fruit growers briefly threatened not to hire the white workers behind the eviction, preferring to let melons rot on vines to hiring such characters. As a result of this stance, the eviction had the opposite effect of what the mob had intended. By August, Japanese workers had returned and, were nearly the only people employed to pick melons.

The affair gained national attention, and California Governor William Stephens vowed that justice would be served. Six men were quickly arrested but were apparently untroubled by the charges, stating that leaders of Turlock's American Legion and Chamber of Commerce had told them that no trouble would come of their actions. Although a former Turlock night watchman testified that one of the accused had disclosed a plan "to clean up Turlock of the Japs," all of the arrested were acquitted.

The editorial line of the San Francisco Chronicle opposed both the evictions and Japanese labor, with one column stating that "we in California are determined that Oriental workers shall be kept out of the state. But that does not mean that the decent citizens of California will tolerate for one moment such proceedings as the attack of a mob on the Japanese cantaloupe workers in the Turlock district."

In 1930, Turlock's population was 20% Assyrian. They were such a significant part of the population that the southern part of town even became referred to as Little Urmia, referring to the region of northwestern Iran from which most had come. In the 1930s, Turlock was cited by Ripley's Believe It or Not as having the most churches per capita in the US, which had partly to do with the variety of ethnic churches established for the relatively small settler population. Various religious centers reflecting a diverse population, such as Sikh Gurdwaras, various Assyrian Christian churches, and many mainline Protestant, Mormon and Roman Catholic churches have been built.

During World War II, after the attack on Pearl Harbor, the US government placed Japanese Americans into concentration camps all over the country. The Stanislaus County Fairgrounds was the site of one of 15 temporary "assembly centers" and held 3,669 Japanese Americans, most of whom were US citizens. The US Army also built the Ballico Auxiliary Field (1942–1946) for training pilots in Turlock.

In 1960, California State University, Stanislaus, opened to students, helping to spur growth in the city as the university expanded in its early years. In the 1970s, State Route 99 (formerly U.S. Route 99) was completed through the area, largely bypassing the then-incorporated areas of Turlock in a route to the west of the city through mostly undeveloped land. Since that time, the city has grown westward considerably to meet the freeway's north–south path, but urban development west of the freeway has only recently begun to take hold. In an attempt to allow for orderly growth of the city, comprehensive growth master plans have established urban growth boundaries since the 1960s.

Turlock experienced extensive growth of both residential and commercial areas in the 1980s, following a statewide boom in housing demand and construction. The housing boom of the 1980s diminished in the early 1990s but increased again in the second half of the decade, partly as a result of San Francisco Bay Area growth, which placed a higher demand for more affordable housing in outlying areas. After the dot-com bust, housing demand intensified, producing higher house prices in an area formerly known for affordable housing. A recent boom in the retail sector has produced considerable growth along the Highway 99 corridor. The city reached its northern urban growth boundary, Taylor Road, in the late 1990s, and growth beyond it is restricted by the city's Master Plan.

Geography
Turlock is located in Stanislaus County, between the cities of Modesto and Merced, at the intersection of State Route 99 and State Route 165.

Climate
Turlock has hot, mostly dry summers and cool, wet winters.

There are an average of 48 days with measurable precipitation. Although snow is very rare in Turlock,  fell in January 1922 and  fell in February 1976.

Demographics

2010
The 2010 United States Census reported that Turlock had a population of 69,733. The racial makeup of Turlock was 47,864 (69.8%) White, 1,160 (1.7%) African American, 601 (0.9%) Native American, 3,865 (5.6%) Asian, 313 (0.5%) Pacific Islander, 11,328 (16.5%) from other races, and 3,418 (5.0%) from two or more races. Hispanic or Latino of any race were 24,957 persons (36.4%). The Census reported that 67,342 people (98.2% of the population) lived in households, 687 (1.0%) lived in non-institutionalized group quarters, and 520 (0.8%) were institutionalized.

There were 22,772 households, out of which 9,339 (41.0%) had children under the age of 18 living in them, 12,055 (52.9%) were opposite-sex married couples living together, 3,161 (13.9%) had a female householder with no husband present, 1,453 (6.4%) had a male householder with no wife present. There were 1,387 (6.1%) unmarried opposite-sex partnerships, and 153 (0.7%) same-sex married couples or partnerships. 4,755 households (20.9%) were made up of individuals, and 2,058 (9.0%) had someone living alone who was 65 years of age or older. The average household size was 2.96. There were 16,669 families (73.2% of all households); the average family size was 3.45. The population was spread out, with 18,820 people (27.5%) under the age of 18, 8,087 people (11.8%) aged 18 to 24, 18,313 people (26.7%) aged 25 to 44, 15,317 people (22.3%) aged 45 to 64, and 8,012 people (11.7%) who were 65 years of age or older. The median age was 32.5 years. For every 100 females, there were 94.8 males. For every 100 females age 18 and over, there were 90.9 males.

The homeowner vacancy rate was 2.6%; the rental vacancy rate was 9.0%. 37,867 people (55.2% of the population) lived in owner-occupied housing units and 29,475 people (43.0%) lived in rental housing units.

2000
As of the United States 2000 Census, there were 55,810 people, 18,408 households, and 13,434 families residing in the city. The racial makeup of the city was 72.3% White, 1.4% African American, 0.9% Native American, 4.5% Asian, 0.3% Pacific Islander, 15.2% from other races, and 5.4% from two or more races. 29.4% of the population were Hispanic or Latino of any race.

4.9% of Turlock's population reported ancestry in the category Assyrian. This was the fourth highest percentage in the United States for this category, the highest for a community outside of Oakland County, Michigan and the only one of the top seven places in this category that was not one of Detroit's northern suburbs.

There were 18,408 households, out of which 40.3% had children under the age of 18 living with them, 54.8% were married couples living together, 13.1% had a female householder with no husband present, and 27.0% were non-families. 21.2% of all households were made up of individuals, and 9.1% had someone living alone who was 65 years of age or older. The average household size was 2.92 and the average family size was 3.42. In the city, the population was spread out, with 29.8% under the age of 18, 11.4% from 18 to 24, 28.9% from 25 to 44, 18.1% from 45 to 64, and 11.8% who were 65 years of age or older. The median age was 31 years. For every 100 females, there were 92.8 males. For every 100 females age 18 and over, there were 89.1 males. The median income for a household in the city was $39,050, and the median income for a family was $44,501. Males had a median income of $35,801 versus $27,181 for females. The per capita income for the city was $16,844. 16.2% of the population and 12.4% of families were below the poverty line. Out of the total population, 18.8% of those under the age of 18 and 9.8% of those 65 and older were living below the poverty line.

Culturally, the area is home to large concentrations of Americans of South Asian descent (particularly Sikhs), Mexican-Americans, and people of varied European descent. Swedes and Portuguese were early settlers to the area. Continued immigration from the Azores Islands (Portugal) in recent decades has established a large Portuguese-speaking community within the city. Turlock is a major center for the Assyrian community in the United States, who began to arrive in the 1910s seeking opportunities in farming. By 1924 the Assyrian Evangelical Church was established and by the 1950s, 8% of the population of Turlock was Assyrian. There was an increased influx into Turlock in the 1970s following political strife in Iraq and in the 1980s following the 1979 Islamic Revolution in Iran.

Economy

Foster Farms, Emanuel Medical Center, and Turlock Unified School District are the largest employers in Turlock. MedicAlert, a non-profit, charitable, and membership-based organization for 24/7 medical response information, has been based in Turlock since its founding in 1956. La Perla Tapatía Supermarkets is headquartered in Turlock.

Sports
The indoor soccer team the Turlock Cal Express of the Major Arena Soccer League 2 (MASL2) plays at the Turlock Indoor Soccer Complex. Turlock is home to the California State University, Stanislaus Warriors in the National Collegiate Athletic Association (NCAA).

Government

Turlock uses a Council–Manager form of government. It is led by a five-member City Council consisting of a Mayor, a Vice-Mayor, and three Councilmembers. The Mayor is elected at-large, while each Councilmember is elected to one of four electoral districts. All five Councilmembers are elected to four-year terms. The Turlock City Council holds public meetings every second and fourth Tuesday of each month at 6:00 p.m. City Hall is located at 156 South Broadway in Turlock. A directly elected City Treasurer also serves a four-year term.

Education

College

Turlock is the home of California State University, Stanislaus, a liberal arts university, and part of the 23-campus California State University system. As of 2013, CSU Stanislaus reported a student population of 7,754 undergraduate students. The number rises to 8,917 when considering all students, including graduate students.

Secondary
Turlock is home to two public high schools, Turlock High School and John H. Pitman High School, as well as a continuation high school, Roselawn High School, both being part of the Turlock Unified School District. Turlock High School, the first in the city, opened in 1907, and Pitman opened in a major growth zone of northern Turlock in 2002.

Turlock Christian High School is a private high school within the city. Classes are held at Monte Vista Chapel, a church in Turlock. Turlock has two junior high schools, two middle schools and nine elementary schools, one of which got California Distinguished School Award in 2012 and won $10,000 in a competition held by Scotties. The money gained from the competition helped the Turlock Unified School District recently purchase Chromebooks for school use.

Elementary
Turlock is home to Julien, Crowell, Wakefield, Osborn, Cunningham, Earl, Walnut, Medeiros and Brown Elementary Schools inside its city limits.

Media
The Turlock Journal, a local newspaper, has been in continuous operation since 1904.

Infrastructure

Transportation

Turlock Transit operates local bus service, while the Stanislaus Regional Transit Authority operates intercity routes that connect Turlock to other cities in Stanislaus County and to Dublin/Pleasanton station. An Altamont Corridor Express commuter rail station is planned to be constructed in Turlock for service starting in 2027. Amtrak serves Turlock at the nearby Turlock–Denair station.

Notable people

 Richard L. Bare, television director (Green Acres, The Twilight Zone)
 Tom Brandstater, NFL player (Denver, Indianapolis, Miami, St. Louis, Dallas Cowboys)
 Tony Corbin, football player
 Alison Cox, Olympic silver medalist, women's rowing, Athens 2004
 Lester Hayes, NFL athlete (Oakland Raiders)
 Doug James, rhythm and blues saxophonist
 Dot-Marie Jones, athlete and actress
 Colin Kaepernick, NFL quarterback
 Paul Larson, football player (Cal, Chicago Cardinals, Oakland Raiders)
 Brad Lesley, actor, MLB athlete (Cincinnati Reds, Milwaukee Brewers)
 Tommy Mendonca, MLB athlete (Philadelphia Phillies)
 James Mitchell, actor
 Cal Niday, auto racer
 Oliver O'Grady, Irish defrocked Catholic priest
 Jonathan Quinn, football player (Jacksonville Jaguars, Kansas City, Chicago Bears)
 Cory Williams, actor and YouTube personality
Kevin Kramer, MLB athlete (Pittsburg Pirates)

In popular culture
Turlock and Turlock High School are briefly mentioned in the 1973 film American Graffiti.

On the Grateful Dead's live album Europe '72, Bob Weir precedes the song Truckin' with the following introduction:

Of course, by now I need to tell you that this song rose straight to the top of the charts in Turlock, California (Cheers). Numero Uno and it stayed there for a week or two. They love us in Turlock, and we love them for that.

In the 1960s, radio advertisements by Central Valley-based Foster Farms said, "turkeys from Turlock."

See also

California Historical Landmarks in Stanislaus County, California

References

External links

 Official website

 
Assyrian-American culture in California
Cities in Stanislaus County, California
Incorporated cities and towns in California
Populated places established in 1908
1908 establishments in California